Johanne Deschamps (born April 2, 1959 in Saint-Jovite, Quebec) is a Canadian politician.

She is a former administrative assistant and political attaché. She served as a councillor in Val-Barrette, Quebec from 1994 to 2004 and was Commissioner of the Pierre-Neveu School Board in Mont-Laurier, Quebec from 1998 to 2004. After that, she was elected as a Bloc Québécois member of the House of Commons of Canada in the 2004 Canadian federal election. She represents the riding of Laurentides—Labelle. She had also run in the 2000 Canadian federal election for the Bloc in the riding of Pontiac—Gatineau—Labelle but lost. She was re-elected in 2006 and 2008, but lost to NDP candidate Marc-André Morin in the 2011 election.

External links

1959 births
Bloc Québécois MPs
Living people
Members of the House of Commons of Canada from Quebec
People from Mont-Laurier
French Quebecers
Women members of the House of Commons of Canada
Women in Quebec politics
21st-century Canadian politicians
21st-century Canadian women politicians